Md. Tajul Islam Choudhury (31 October 1944 – 13 August 2018) was a Bangladeshi politician. He was elected as a member of parliament seven times from Kurigram-2 constituency. He also served as the Opposition Chief Whip.

References

1944 births
2018 deaths
People from Kurigram District
Jatiya Party politicians
3rd Jatiya Sangsad members
4th Jatiya Sangsad members
5th Jatiya Sangsad members
7th Jatiya Sangsad members
8th Jatiya Sangsad members
10th Jatiya Sangsad members